

A

B

C